Racing Club de Kinshasa is a Congolese football club based in Kinshasa. They play their home games at the 125,000 capacity Stade des Martyrs in Kinshasa.

History
RC Kinshasa was established in 2002 and is currently playing in Linafoot after won the 2018–19 Ligue 2 season and promoting to the top division of congolese football.

Honours
Linafoot Ligue 2
 Winners (1): 2018–19

Entente Provinciale de Football de Kinshasa
 Winners (1): 2013–14

References

External links

RCK logo

Football clubs in the Democratic Republic of the Congo
Football clubs in Kinshasa